Subhankar Chattopadhyay (Bengali:  শুভঙ্কর চট্টোপাধ্যায়; born 1977) is an Indian director, scriptwriter, content creator, and producer. He is a non-fiction show creator in Tollywood.

He directed the film Haanda & Bhonda (2010), starring Mithun Chakraborty. He is known for directing television shows, including Dadagiri Unlimited, Dance Bangla Dance,  Mirakkel and others. Chattopadhyay and his team became known in history of the world television to air their shows twice for a duration of 10 hours continuously, for Super Singer Junior finale and audition. He introduced remote work for a non-fiction singing reality show, Super Singer, amid the COVID-19 pandemic in India. He directed the show where the participants, hosts, and jury shot their respective parts with their mobile phones from the safety of their homes. He has directed 'Mohabijoyer Mohanayok', an event organized to celebrate 50 years of Bangladesh Independence & 100 years birth anniversary of Sheikh Mujibur Rahman. All the prominent cultural personas like Rezwana choudhury Bannya to Swadhin Bangla betar artists were in the show, prime minister of Bangladesh Sheikh Hasina and president of Bangladesh, Mr. Abdul Hamid and India, Mr. Ram Nath Kovind and many more esteemed guests were there to witness the show. Show was on air live in all the government and private satellite channels of Bangladesh.

Life and career 
Chattopadhyay was born in Baruipur, South 24 Parganas, West Bengal, in 1977. He did his schooling from Baruipur High School. He graduated from City College, Kolkata. He started his career at Little Magazine, forayed into electronic media as a scriptwriter following which he worked for Zee Bangla as an executive producer for many years before directing successful non-fiction shows.

Works

Television

Web series

Filmography

Events

Literary works 
He has been practicing his art of writing for years; his writing has also been published in the Desh magazine quite a few numbers of times. In between the year 2000–2003, his literary pieces 'Tobu j Ami Jiggasha Chinho' and 'Prem Porjoton phaad' was published. Beside this, he was also an editor of a magazine called Poddyo Chorcha.

References 

Living people
1977 births
Indian directors
Writers from West Bengal
Indian producers